Khlong Maha Nak is a khlong (canal) in Bangkok and  considered one of Bangkok's oldest canals. It starts from Khlong Rop Krung (old city moat) in the area of Mahakan Fort and Wat Saket's Golden Mount and continues to the east as far as ends at the intersection with Khlong Saen Saep in Ban Khrua neighbourhood, tote distance 1.3 km (0.81 mi).

The canal was canalize by the royal intention of King Phutthayotfa Chulalok (Rama I) in 1783 after establishment of Rattanakosin kingdom (today's Bangkok) only one year, used as a waterway for people to boating and playing Khlon Sakkawa (กลอนสักวา; a kind of Thai poem). An ancient culture that has been around since Ayutthaya period. Its name "Maha Nak" is derived from the namesake canal used in the old Ayutthaya kingdom. It's believed that, it received this name from a monk named "Maha Nak", who initiated the canalize for use in the war after the end of Burmese–Siamese War (1547–49) shortly.

At the end of the canal is connected with Khlong Saen Saep. It's a place where people often paddle and pass as the main waterway since the early Rattanakosin period. Later in the reigns of King Mongkut (Rama IV) and Chulalongkorn (Rama V) it has become a famous and popular floating market implicitly since it is a route to Chachoengsao province, eastern by Khlong Saen Saep. The same area nowadays has become the wholesale market for cheap clothes as Bobae Market, and is the largest wholesale fruits market in Bangkok named Maha Nak Market or Saphan Khao Market. It also has become the administrative district of two khwaeng (sub-districts) under Bangkok Metropolitan Administration (BMA), namely Si Yaek Maha Nak in Dusit and Khlong Maha Nak in Pom Prap Sattru Phai district.

Moreover, the phase of Khlong Maha Nak in Bobae Market is the home of one of the oldest Muslim communities in Bangkok, Maha Nak community. They have Masjid Maha Nak as the center of the community.

References 

Pom Prap Sattru Phai district
Phra Nakhon district
Dusit district
Unregistered ancient monuments in Bangkok
Canals in Thailand
Canals opened in 1783
History of Bangkok